The Searights Tollhouse of the National Road is a historic toll house on United States Route 40, the former route of the historic National Road, north of Uniontown, Pennsylvania.  Built in 1835, it is one of two surviving tollhouses (out of six) built by the state of Pennsylvania to collect tolls along the portion of the road that passed through that state.  It has been restored by the state and is now maintained by the local historical society.  It was declared a National Historic Landmark in 1964.

Description and history
A single-story porch extends around about three-quarters of the tower, and there are two single-story single-room wings extending to the north and west. The building was designed so that the tollkeeper had good views of the road in both directions, and was originally fitted with a swinging gate that would block the road.

The portion of the National Road that passes through Pennsylvania was built between 1811 and 1818, and was one of the first public works projects of the federal government.  The road greatly improved travel times between the Cumberland, Maryland, and Wheeling, West Virginia, and the Pennsylvania stretch in particular benefited from economic development along its route.  In 1835 the federal government turned control over the road to the state.  In order to maintain the roadway, the state instituted tolls, building six tollhouses along its route.  This one was built near the tavern of William Searight, the state commissioner in charge of the roadway.  Tolls were collected on the road until the 1870s, after which the tollhouse was abandoned.  It was restored by the state, and now stands as a historic marker along the road.

See also
Petersburg Tollhouse, Pennsylvania's other surviving National Road tollhouse
List of National Historic Landmarks in Pennsylvania
National Register of Historic Places listings in Fayette County, Pennsylvania

References

National Historic Landmarks in Pennsylvania
Houses completed in 1835
Transport infrastructure completed in 1835
Buildings and structures in Fayette County, Pennsylvania
National Register of Historic Places in Fayette County, Pennsylvania
Government buildings on the National Register of Historic Places in Pennsylvania
Toll houses on the National Register of Historic Places